William Bell (born July 22, 1971) is a former American football running back in the National Football League for the Washington Redskins.  He played collegiately for the Georgia Tech Yellow Jackets.

Georgia Tech 
Bell played Running Back at Georgia Tech (1989–1993) and was a member of the 1990 National Championship team.  Bell was featured on the cover of Sports Illustrated, in the November 12, 1990 issue. As of the 2010 season Bell was still 8th all time on the Georgia Tech rushing list with 2,026 yard.

References

1971 births
Living people
American football running backs
Georgia Tech Yellow Jackets football players
Players of American football from Miami
Washington Redskins players